is a Japanese idol. She is a former member of NMB48 and Team N.

Biography 

Murase passed NMB48's 2nd generation auditions in May 2011. Her debut was on June 5, 2011. Her stage debut was on August 13, 2011. In January 2012, she was selected to join Team M. Prior to joining NMB48, she had no experience in dancing, and remembering various things was tough but fun.

In September 2013, Murase was selected to be the center for the unit  in the single Kamonegix. In November 2013, she was selected to be in NMB48's Senbatsu for the coupling track in AKB48's single Suzukake Nanchara. In March 2014, she was first selected to join senbatsu for the single Takane no Ringo.

In June 2018, she and current members of AKB48 and their sister groups participated in the survival-reality show Produce 48. On Episode 11, she was eliminated in the third elimination round finishing at 22nd place.

On March 1, 2019, she was transferred to Team N.

On October 10, 2020, she announced her graduation from NMB48 at a concert at the NMB48 Theater.

Discography

NMB48 singles

AKB48 singles

Appearances

Stage Units
NMB48 Kenkyuusei Stage "Party ga Hajimaru yo"
 "Kiss wa Dame yo"

Team M 1st Stage "Idol no Yoake"
 "Zannen Shoujo"

Team M 2nd Stage "RESET"
 "Kokoro no Hashi no Sofa"

Team BII 4th Stage "Renai Kinshi Jourei"
 "Heart Gata Virus"

References

External links
 NMB48 Official Profile 
 Official Blog
 Sae Murase on Google+

1997 births
Living people
Japanese idols
Japanese women pop singers
People from Osaka Prefecture
Musicians from Osaka Prefecture
NMB48 members
Produce 48 contestants
21st-century Japanese women singers
21st-century Japanese singers